The California State Police (CSP) was a state level security police agency founded on March 15,  1887 which primarily served to protect the State Capitol Building, the Governor, other state agencies located throughout the state, and thousands of state employees 24 hours a day. They provided security and police services to all state agencies that did not have their own police force.  They patrolled the State Water Project (also known as the California Aqueduct) and were the state's de facto capitol police.  They provided dignitary protection for the Governor and other state officials as directed, including the California Supreme Court in San Francisco. They provided investigative services to elected officials through their Threat Assessment Detail and criminal investigations of crimes committed against the state through the Bureau of Investigative Services.  They also performed tax seizures for the California Franchise Tax Board and Board of Equalization.  Detectives and line officers routinely conducted investigations with other state agencies and allied law enforcement departments. State Police officers held jurisdiction throughout the State, providing law enforcement on and off California properties. The California State Police merged with the California Highway Patrol in 1995.

Etymology
Unlike 48 other states, the title used by the California State Police was always "Police Officer" unlike the CHP who used "Traffic Officer" and never "trooper". The official shoulder patch was: a green shield w/ gold borders, the words (gold lettering) "CALIFORNIA STATE POLICE" on top, the State Capitol building's dome and the state flag prominently featured against a 7-point star badge. At the bottom of the patch was a ribbon panel that had gold lettering with the words "Dedicated to Service."

History

The agency traces to 1853 when the state legislature authorized a law enforcement body called the California State Rangers. The Rangers' mission was to capture the notorious gang leader Joaquin Murrieta.  Joaquin Murrieta was captured, shot, killed and beheaded by Capt. Harry Love at the Arroyo Cantua.  The California State Rangers were then disbanded years later.  On March 15, 1887, the California State Legislature authorized a law enforcement body with Captain Harry Love and one other ranger, as its sole members to protect the State Capitol and grounds.  They were paid $100.00 monthly and grew to a force of 12 officers.  In 1911 the legislature approved more positions, uniforms, and defined the department giving it the official name of, "California State Capitol Police".  Eventually as the department grew to approximately 400 personnel and its duties expanded, the word "Capitol" was dropped from the agency's name.

Public awareness

The California State Police (CSP) Division, its official title being a division of the California Department of General Services, was a small agency and its officers and patrol cars were infrequent sights outside of the state’s larger metropolitan areas. Its largest presence was in the Sacramento (State Capitol Division), Los Angeles, San Francisco, Redding and San Diego metropolitan areas. Its aircraft could be seen flying along the California Aqueduct.
 
Some of the most visible personnel of the CSP were its State Security Officers (SSOs) who were peace officers while on duty. SSOs held powers of arrest as regular Police Officers under the California Penal Code (CPC), however, they were not full-time peace officers. Their powers of arrest were only while on duty performing their specific assignments. SSOs were usually at fixed locations at state buildings on foot beats. SSOs sometimes performed patrol (automobile) duties in very limited geographical areas such as Exposition Park in Los Angeles.

Despite the California State Police presence in large metropolitan cities, at the State Capitol, at busy State office buildings, on foot beats, on patrol in fully marked police vehicles on the streets and highways, there were many Californians who were still unaware that California had its own State Police. This public knowledge of the California State Police didn't fully come to light until its merger with the California Highway Patrol when it received major state news coverage in 1995.
 
At the time of the merger the California State Police was the state’s oldest law enforcement agency (1887-1995 (~108 years)), a record that is still held today.  The California Highway Patrol (CHP) was founded in 1929 and its officers were classified as "State Traffic Officers" until the merger. After the merger and subsequent charter responsibilities were taken over by the CHP, their official title was simply reduced to "Officer" thus dropping "traffic" from their current seven-point star badge.

While they did maintain security personnel at major State facilities, they also maintained SCUBA units, Air Patrol Sections with their own fixed wing aircraft, equestrian mounted units, special investigations personnel, EOD (Explosive Ordnance Disposal) bomb techs and equipment, Special Weapons And Tactics teams (SWAT), bicycle patrols, 4wd patrol units, regional detective squads, training personnel, Dignitary Protection Command which saw to not only the security and safety of State elected and appointed officers, but also often to visiting dignitaries who might not have their own protective staff and provided training for like units from other agencies, Threat Assessment Investigations, armorers, and clerical personnel as well as routine uniformed patrol officers and vehicles.

CSP sworn personnel were regulated and certified by the State's Department of Justice Commission On Peace Officer Standards and Training (POST). CSP officers were expected to, at any time, at any place, perform the same duties of any city, county or other state law enforcement personnel except those relating to custodial duties (jail/prison). As such, they were the State's oldest general law enforcement agency. Beyond the previously described duties, CSP personnel regularly served and executed State tax warrants, notices of seizure and maintained the peace (bailiff duties) in thousands of State Administrative Court hearings, meetings and procedures. The CSP regularly provided support personnel to other law enforcement agencies such as the State's Alcoholic Beverage Control (ABC), the State's Department of Justice Bureau of Narcotic Enforcement (BNE), State DMV investigations, Department of Health Services investigations, local law enforcement and coordinated State, Federal, Local Joint Agency Task Forces.

Organization
The last Chief of the CSP was long-time Sacramento County Sheriff (1971–1983) Duane Lowe. Lowe served as a Deputy Commissioner of the California Highway Patrol (CHP) during the transitional period of the merger of the two organizations. Lowe retired in 1996, a year after the CSP and CHP merged into one agency. Lowe would pass away ten years later at the age of 90.

Rank structure

Penal Code Status
At the time of the merger into the California Highway Patrol the California State Police received its peace officer authority under the California Penal Code (CPC). California State Police Officers were defined as Peace Officers under CPC section 830.2 and its Security Officers were defined as Peace Officers under CPC section 830.4. A California State Police Officer had to attend and pass a California Peace Officer Standards and Training (POST)-certified Academy consisting of up to 23 weeks of instruction depending on academy location.

Equipment

In the final years of its existence the CSP fleet consisted of white Dodge Diplomats, then Chevrolet Caprices and finally Ford Crown Victorias with a large green and gold stripe running the length of the car. On the trunk lids in gold with green trim were the words “State Police". On each driver and front passenger door was a large seven-point gold-star badge with the State Capitol on the center seal. The words "State Police" in gold with green trim were on the front fenders.

Prior to 1983 the CSP fleet consisted of Dodges and Plymouth's, also white, with no striping and the State Police shoulder patch as the door insignia.

Of note, CSP patrol cars (circa 1975-1983) were Plymouth Volares as part of a state fleet fuel saving directive by Governor Jerry Brown during his first two terms. Even State University and State Hospital Police downsized their vehicles or utilized Plymouth Fury IIIs with 225 c.i.d. “slant sixes” known as “campus police specials”. The California Highway Patrol by nature of their mission was exempted from this directive.

CSP 1988 Chevrolet Caprice

CSP 1995 Ford Crown Victoria Police Interceptor

See also

 State police (United States)
 Capitol police
 List of law enforcement agencies in California
 CHP - California State Police Merger

References

Defunct law enforcement agencies of California
Defunct state law enforcement agencies of the United States
California Highway Patrol
Defunct state agencies of California
Government agencies established in 1887
1887 establishments in California